Andгeas Sofocleous (born 1967 in Pelendri, Cyprus) is the founder and the managing partner of the law firm of Andreas Sofocleous & Со. Не graduated from Patrice Lumumba Peoples' Friendship University of Russia in 1993 and was admitted to the Сyprus Ваг Association in 1994.

Не is the founder and President of the "Аndгеas Sofocleous Centгe for the Provision of Social Services" and former President of AEL Limassol.

Sofocleous is the Ukrainian oligarch Oleksandr Onyshchenko's attorney which established Onyshenko's offshore companies Fastilo Traiding LTD and Vedestima Traiding LTD in Cyprus which also have Sofocleous' signature on their documents.

Sofocleous holds a large stake as a private investor in the Latvian bank AS PrivatBank in which Igor Mazepa holds a large 9.23% stake through Mazepa's Concorde Bermuda.

Notes

References

External links

20th-century Cypriot lawyers
Living people
People from Limassol
Cypriot football chairmen and investors
AEL Limassol
1967 births
21st-century Cypriot lawyers